ORP Ryś  was a  which saw service in the Polish Navy from 1931 to 1955. Her name means Lynx in Polish.

History
Ryś was laid down in 1927 in Nantes, France; launched in 1929; and entered service in 1932.  When World War II began on September 1, 1939, she took part in the Worek Plan for the defense of the Polish coast.  After suffering battle damage, the submarine withdrew to neutral Swedish waters and was interned on September 17.  After the war, she returned to Poland in October 1945 and served in the navy of the Polish People's Republic until 1955.  She was scrapped in 1956.

External links
 Uboat.net on ORP Ryś

Wilk-class submarines
World War II submarines of Poland
1929 ships
Ships built in France